Lysine-specific demethylase 5D is an enzyme that in humans is encoded by the KDM5D gene. KDM5D belongs to the alpha-ketoglutarate-dependent hydroxylases superfamily.

This gene encodes a protein containing zinc finger domains. A short peptide derived from this protein is a minor histocompatibility antigen which can lead to graft rejection of male donor cells in a female recipient.

References

Further reading

External links 
 
 

Transcription factors
Human 2OG oxygenases
EC 1.14.11